Estyn Griffiths (22 July 1927 – 1 April 2017) was a Welsh amateur footballer who played as a centre half in the Football League for Wrexham. He was capped by Wales at amateur level.

Career statistics

Honours 
Llay Welfare
 Welsh Amateur Cup: 1948–49

References 

Welsh footballers
English Football League players
Wales amateur international footballers
Association football wing halves
1927 births
Sportspeople from Mold, Flintshire
Wrexham A.F.C. players
2017 deaths
Chelmsford City F.C. players
Llay Welfare F.C. players